= Jeju High School =

Location
- Nohyeong-dong, Jeju City, Jeju Province; Korea
- Coordinates: 33.4723°N 126.4816°E

Information
- Type: Public
- Established: 1907
- Faculty: 56
- Enrollment: 1049
- Website: jeju.jje.hs.kr

Jeju High School (Korean: 제주고등학교; Hanja: 濟州高等學校) is a public high school located in Jeju City, South Korea.
